Face of the Rising Sun may refer to:

a 1996 novel by William Sarabande
Tyler Breeze's nickname for himself in 2015